Woodlawn Cemetery, located in Fairmont, West Virginia is an example of the rural cemetery. It was laid out by Tell W. Nicolet of the firm of Morris and Knowles of Pittsburgh, PA. It is listed on the National Register of Historic Places as a historic district.

History
The cemetery was established in the early spring of 1875. Joseph R. Hamilton was climbing the fence between his father's farm and that of Norval Barns. The loaded rifle he was carrying accidentally discharged, killing him. His father's decision to "bury him where he lay" led to the families establishing a small burying ground. They opened the fence line between their properties and enclosed about a quarter of an acre to use for family burials.

Ten years later, in December 1885, the Woodlawn Cemetery Company was incorporated and plots were offered for sale to the larger community.  were purchased from each of the land owners, Elmus Hamilton and Norval Barns. Many of the early leaders of the Fairmont community were laid to rest here. Among them is Francis Harrison Pierpont, the Governor of the Restored State of Virginia from 1861–1868, his wife Julia and three of their four children.

Notable burials
Boaz Fleming, the founder of Fairmont, is here with his wife, Elizabeth. Other members of his family are here as well, including Clarissa Fleming Hamilton, his grandson Elmus Hamilton, owner of the Hamilton farm, and great-grandson, Joseph R. Hamilton. Another descendant is Aretas B. Fleming, eighth governor of West Virginia. A lawyer, Mr. Fleming was among the men who created the Fairmont Development Company and worked to develop Fairmont, West Virginia.

James Otis Watson is considered the father of the bituminous coal industry in north central West Virginia. He and Pierpont owned the first coal mine to be commercially viable following the completion of the Baltimore and Ohio Railroad linking Fairmont with the eastern seaboard markets. One of his daughters married Aretas B. Fleming. His sons, James Edwin Watson, Sylvanus Lamb Watson and Clarence Wayland Watson are also buried here.

A governor, a Congressman and a national Senator are rolled into one in Matthew Mansfield Neely.

Other notable burials include:
Alpheus F. Haymond, a prominent judge and member of the West Virginia Supreme Court of Appeals, Sam Jones, a Major League Baseball pitcher, Benjamin F. Martin, a member of the U.S. House of Representatives, and Clarence Wayland Watson, a coal baron, World War One officer and member of the United States Senate.

See also
National Register of Historic Places listings in Marion County, West Virginia

References

Cemeteries on the National Register of Historic Places in West Virginia
Fairmont, West Virginia
Historic districts in Marion County, West Virginia
Protected areas of Marion County, West Virginia
National Register of Historic Places in Marion County, West Virginia
1875 establishments in West Virginia
Historic districts on the National Register of Historic Places in West Virginia
Rural cemeteries